Gopalila also called as Krishnalila is a traditional form of  itinerant glove - puppet theatre of Odisha state. The art of Gopalila is mainly concentrated in the coastal district includes, Cuttack, Puri, Kendrapara, Ganjam and Dhenkanal. Gopa refers to the "cowherd boys" in associated with the life of lord Krishna and Lila means "play". The puppeteers are Gopals belongs to the caste of cowherds. In religious occasions, especially  Janmastami and Govardhan Puja, the puppeteers performed to entertain local villagers. Puppets are made of wood and paper and their bodies are padded with cloth. The lower half being covered with a long skirt. In southern Odisha, the puppets have legs which touch the ground; but in the north Odisha, the puppets are without legs.

Puppeteers usually travel in pairs from village to village carrying their basket of puppets with a small box like stage, large enough to mask the performer while he manipulates the puppets above his head. The second member of the party sits nearby, the pakhavaj playing the drum, a harmonium player support the performance, the singer singing and narrating incidents from the life of god krishna. But nowadays this tradition losing its popularity and few performers are active today.

References

Odia culture
Intangible Cultural Heritage of Humanity
Cultural heritage of India
Folk dances of Odisha
Puppetry in India
Puppet theaters